Watervliet may refer to:
Watervliet (Belgium), a village
Watervliet, Michigan
Watervliet Township, Michigan
Watervliet, New York, a city
Watervliet (town), New York, a former town

See also
Watervliet Arsenal, an arsenal in Watervliet, New York
Hieronymus Lauweryn van Watervliet
Watervliet Shaker Historic District, Colonie, New York